The 2020 Colonial Athletic Association men's basketball tournament was the postseason men's basketball tournament for the Colonial Athletic Association for  the 2019–20 NCAA Division I men's basketball season. The tournament was held March 7–10, 2020 at the Entertainment and Sports Arena in Washington, D.C.

Seeds
All 10 CAA teams participate in the tournament. Teams are seeded by conference record, with a tiebreaker system used to seed teams with identical conference records. The top six teams receive a bye to the quarterfinals.

Schedule

Bracket

* denotes overtime game

See also
 2020 CAA women's basketball tournament

References

Tournament
Colonial Athletic Association men's basketball tournament
College basketball tournaments in Washington, D.C.
CAA men's basketball tournament
CAA men's basketball tournament